The New Beginning (2012) was a professional wrestling pay-per-view (PPV) event promoted by New Japan Pro-Wrestling (NJPW). The event took place on February 12, 2012, in Osaka, Osaka, at the Osaka Prefectural Gymnasium. The event featured eight matches, four of which were contested for championships. The event was the first major event held by NJPW after the promotion had been sold to Bushiroad. It was the third event under the New Beginning name.

Storylines
The New Beginning featured eight professional wrestling matches that involved different wrestlers from pre-existing scripted feuds and storylines. Wrestlers portrayed villains, heroes, or less distinguishable characters in the scripted events that built tension and culminated in a wrestling match or series of matches.

Event
In the third match of the event, the No Remorse Corps (Davey Richards and Rocky Romero) recaptured the IWGP Junior Heavyweight Tag Team Championship from Apollo 55 (Prince Devitt and Ryusuke Taguchi), while Tencozy (Hiroyoshi Tenzan and Satoshi Kojima) successfully defended the IWGP Tag Team Championship against previous champions Bad Intentions (Giant Bernard and Karl Anderson). This would turn out to be the final match of Bad Intentions, the longest reigning IWGP Tag Team Champions in history, as the following month, Giant Bernard returned to WWE as "Lord Tensai". The event featured two title changes; in the first Hirooki Goto captured the IWGP Intercontinental Championship from Masato Tanaka, while in the main event Kazuchika Okada, who had just the previous month returned from a twenty-month American excursion, defeated Hiroshi Tanahashi to win the IWGP Heavyweight Championship for the first time. NJPW called the result of the main event the "upset of the century".

Reception
In his review of the show, Dave Meltzer of the Wrestling Observer Newsletter criticized the decision to take the IWGP Heavyweight Championship off Hiroshi Tanahashi, writing "[t]here is very little that works well in modern wrestling, and when you've got a guy on top who is carrying the ball, it's not the time to replace him". Meltzer wrote that in Japan the general reaction to the title change was negative. Though Meltzer went on to call the match between Tanahashi and Okada "excellent", he credited it entirely to Tanahashi, writing that Okada looked "green" and "way out of his league".

Results

References

External links
The official New Japan Pro-Wrestling website

2012
2012 in professional wrestling
February 2012 events in Japan
Professional wrestling in Osaka
Events in Osaka